Sos Kundi is one of the Ndu languages of Sepik River region of northern Papua New Guinea, and is spoken by approximately 3,500 people who live in the East Sepik Province.

References

Languages of East Sepik Province
Ndu languages